Rani Maria Vattalil (29 January 1954 – 25 February 1995) – in religious Rani Maria – was an Indian Syro Malabar religious sister and a social worker in the Franciscan Clarist Congregation who worked among the poor within the Diocese of Indore. Vattalil dedicated herself to the catechetical formation and educational instruction during her time as a religious as she moved place to place teaching in different areas; she was vocal in matters of social justice and in social activism which led to her death at the hands of those who were opposed to her efforts in aiding the poor and downtrodden.

She was beatified in Indore on 4 November 2017.

Life

Childhood and education
Mariam Vattalil was born in Kerala on 29 January 1954 as the second of seven children to Paily and Eliswa Vattalil. Her baptism was celebrated at the Church of Saint Thomas on the following 5 February with her name being chosen in honor of the Mother of God. Her siblings were: Stephen, Annie, Varghese, Thressiamma, Celine (later became a Franciscan clarist as "Selmy Paul") and Lusy.
Vattalil made both her First Communion and Confirmation on 30 April 1966 and often frequented catechism lessons. She studied at a government-run primary school before she commenced her high school studies. But her greater call was to serve God and this was something that she shared with her cousin Cicily who desired the very same thing.

Religious life
Vattalil joined the Franciscan Clarist Congregation at Kidangoor following the completion of her secondary schooling and assumed the religious name of "Rani Maria" upon joining and entering their novitiate. Her cousin Cicily would become "Soni Maria". The two set off for the convent and entered the order on 3 July 1971 for their aspirancy period which concluded on 30 October 1972. Their postulancy spanned from 1 November 1972 to 29 April 1973 and their novitiate spanned from 30 April 1973 to 20 April 1974.

Her first profession was made on 1 May 1974 before she was sent to Saint Mary's convent in Bijnor where she arrived on 24 December 1975; she there as a teacher from 8 September 1976 to 7 August 1978. Her duties continued there and she made her final profession of vows on 22 May 1980 at Ankamaly in the church of Saint Hormis. On 21 July 1983 she was transferred to Odagady and arrived there on 25 July where she served as the coordinator of social activities. From 1 June to 31 July 1985 she spent time in silence and solitude at Aluva while later serving as the local superior from 30 May 1989 to 15 May 1992. It was around this time that she received a degree in sociology from the Rewa University. Vattalil was later transferred to Udayanagar on 15 May 1992 and arrived there on 18 May.

Murder
Vattalil was murdered in a knife attack due to the hitman Samandar Singh at Nachanbore Hill in Indore on 25 February 1995 while she made her way to Indore in a bus; she had 40 major injuries besides 14 bruises and unto the last breath said: "Jesus!" repeatedly. The murder was arranged because some landlords were offended due to her work among the landless poor.

On 25 February 1995 she woke up early for breakfast after having gone to the chapel prior to anyone else joining her there. She and two other religious reached the bus stand to be told that the bus trip was cancelled. The trio decided to return to the convent when they saw the bus with the name 'Kapil' which was the one that she was to travel on. Sister Liza Rose asked if the conductor could reserve a seat for Rani Maria to which the conductor allowed. Sister Liza Rose helped her into the bus and bade her farewell.

A man dressed in white kept her bag near the driver and asked her to sit in the back, which was something unusual in the town since the nuns were given front seats whenever in public transport. Vattalil agreed where she was seated with three men who had the intention of killing her. The leader – Jeevan Singh – sat with his guard Dharmendra and Samundar Singh. Jeevan began insulting her before Samundar rose from his seat and asked the driver to stop the bus. Singh broke a coconut against a rock on the road's side and entered the bus distributing the pieces to the passengers. He offered one to her but withdrew it to make a fool out of her before drawing a knife and stabbing her in the stomach. He continued to stab her and dragged her out of the bus, which had stopped, and continued stabbing her. The passengers were too wrought with fear to intervene with some fleeing the scene in panic.

The police at 10:45am contacted the nuns to inform them of what had happened and to tell them that their slain sister's remains were still on the side of the road. The distraught nuns contacted the Bishop of Indore George Anathil to inform him of what had happened before Anathil and some priests reached the spot at 2:00pm to find her bloodied corpse which was taken to the episcopal residence to be cleaned and laid in state.

Posthumous recognition
Cardinal Oswald Gracias described her work as an "heroic example ... siding with the poor and disadvantaged". A museum in her honour exists in Ernakulam. Her remains were exhumed for inspection and reburial on 18 November 2016 in Indore with the diocesan bishop overseeing the exhumation.

Samundar Singh
Singh was convicted of Vattalil's murder and was sentenced to life imprisonment. Vattalil's sister visited Singh in prison where she expressed her forgiveness on 31 August 2002. Singh was overcome after witnessing such a gesture and begged for forgiveness for what he had done while expressing repentance. Vattalil's mother visited Singh on 25 February 2003 and kissed his hands as a sign of forgiveness.

Singh was released from prison in 2006 due to good conduct. He was pardoned by Vattalil's family, and he is considered one of their own. He was moved to tears when he learned of her impending beatification in March 2017 and expressed his enthusiasm for being able to attend the beatification.

Beatification
The diocesan process took place in Indore from 29 June 2005 to 28 June 2007.
The Congregation for the Causes of Saints received the Positio in 2014. Pope Francis approved the cause on 23 March 2017 and confirmed that Vattalil would be beatified on 4 November 2017 in Indore. The postulator assigned to the cause is Fra Giovangiuseppe Califano.

In popular culture
The documentary entitled The Heart of a Murderer, depicting the murder and subsequent repentance of Samundar Singh, was the winner at the World Interfaith Harmony Film Festival of 2013.

References

External links
 Hagiography Circle
 F.C.C.

1954 births
1995 deaths
20th-century Indian educators
20th-century Roman Catholic martyrs
20th-century venerated Christians
Beatifications by Pope Francis
Deaths by stabbing in India
Franciscan missionaries
Franciscan nuns
Roman Catholic missionaries in India
Indian Franciscans
Indian murder victims
Indian Roman Catholic missionaries
20th-century Eastern Catholic nuns
Indian women activists
Social workers
People from Ernakulam district
Indian Servants of God
Venerated Catholics from Kerala
Victims of anti-Catholic violence
Women educators from Kerala
Educators from Kerala
Indian beatified people
Social workers from Kerala
20th-century women educators